Csaba Lantos (born 2 May 1943) is a Hungarian volleyball player. He competed in the men's tournament at the 1964 Summer Olympics.

References

External links
 

1943 births
Living people
Hungarian men's volleyball players
Olympic volleyball players of Hungary
Volleyball players at the 1964 Summer Olympics
People from Baja, Hungary
Sportspeople from Bács-Kiskun County